Angel Studios is an American video streaming service and Christian media studio. The studio uses equity crowdfunding to finance its original productions by offering individual investors the opportunity to purchase shares in the company and its titles. Content produced by Angel Studios is distributed for free on their own streaming service. Some titles are also available in other third-party streaming services as distribution deals.

The company has produced several titles through crowdfunding, including The Chosen, Dry Bar Comedy, The Wingfeather Saga, and The Tuttle Twins. The Chosen is the largest crowdfunded entertainment project to date, raising $10.3 million from 15,000 investors. As of May 2022, Angel Studios reports that 50,000 people have invested over $100 million for production of new original content.

Angel Studios emerged as the result of a forced bankruptcy reorganization from VidAngel after a four-year lawsuit by four major entertainment studios. A year after bankruptcy, in May 2022, Angel Studios reported a revenue of $123 million.

The streaming service is available worldwide and can be accessed via web browsers or via application software installed on smartphones, tablet computers, and smart TVs.

History

Early years as VidAngel

Angel Studios was originally founded as VidAngel in 2014 by Neal Harmon, Jeffrey Harmon, Daniel Harmon, Jordan Harmon, and Benton Crane. According to Neal Harmon, the brothers wanted to be able to show any movie to their kids without worrying about explicit material. VidAngel provided a filtering service that allowed viewers to skip or mute scenes they did not want to watch from streamed movies and TV shows, by allowing viewers to set customized filters on graphic violence, nudity, and profanity.

In 2016, VidAngel was sued by several major Hollywood studios for copyright violations, accusing the service of streaming unlicensed content that was not created by VidAngel. VidAngel fought the lawsuit for several years, asserting its method was legal under the Family Movie Act of 2005, and then eventually reached a settlement in 2020.

As a result of the lawsuit, the Harmon brothers decided to sell the filtering service business and instead focus on producing original content through equity crowdfunding. The previous VidAngel service was sold to VidAngel Entertainment, and the company was rebranded as Angel Studios in 2021.

Equity crowdfunding
In December of 2016, VidAngel was undergoing a lawsuit. To raise money for operations and lawsuit costs, the company conducted a Regulation A+ securities offering with a goal of $5 million in investment. It met its goal after 28 hours and had crowdfunded over $10 million after five days.

In 2017, the company conducted another Regulation A+ securities offering to crowdfund Season 1 of The Chosen. Neal Harmon and Jeff Harmon worked together with Dallas Jenkins and Derral Evens to produce and stream a multi-season television series about the life of Jesus and his disciples. After a pilot episode was developed, the company raised $13 million in equity crowdfunding to finance the first season, the largest amount ever crowdfunded for a TV show.

Also in 2017, a third foray into equity crowdfunding came from the launch of Dry Bar Comedy, a series of 52 original stand-up comedy sets filmed in Utah that are generally clean and performed by lesser-known comedians. Much of its content went viral, with Dry Bar Comedy videos receiving over two billion views as of 2021.

Launch of Angel Studios
The success of Dry Bar Comedy and The Chosen gave way to a new business model that would allow the company to produce and distribute original content. The founders decided to focus on developing original content using its equity crowdfunding model and rebrand as Angel Studios.

Angel Studios was named after the “angel investors” that participate in the new model that uses equity crowdfunding to finance original productions. These productions are distributed via the Angel Studios streaming platform for free. The company relies on a pay what you want revenue model, coined "Pay It Forward", in which viewers can optionally pay for the content if they choose to support it.

In early 2021, Angel Studios purchased the domain angel.com for $2 million. Soon after, Angel Studios launched an investment portal that offered investment opportunities through Regulation Crowdfunding securities offerings. 

Several productions were successfully funded through the investment portal after its launch in March 2021. Tuttle Twins, a show for children with educational themes on economic freedom raised $4.6 million in equity crowdfunding for its production. The Wingfeather Saga, an animated series based on the award-winning book collection of the same name raised $1 million in the first 48 hours and $5 million in 20 days

In April of 2021, The Chosen, which was originally distributed through the VidAngel platform, was made available on Angel Studios for the launch of Season 2. The show became a viral hit with renowned success worldwide.

In 2022, Angel Studios raised $47 million in an investment round led by a Gigafund, a venture capital company.

As of 2022, Angel Studios has 50,000 individual investors and had over $100 million worth of original content, including 12 titles, in production.

Original content

The Chosen
The Chosen, a streaming multi-season television series about the life of Jesus, was first produced under the VidAngel umbrella and now distributed by Angel Studios. The series was supported by equity crowdfunding and raised over $13 million, the largest amount ever crowdfunded for a TV show.

Dry Bar Comedy
Dry Bar Comedy was one of the company's first forays into original content, launched in 2017. It began as a series of 52 original stand-up comedy sets filmed in Utah that are generally clean and performed by lesser-known comedians. Dry Bar Comedy has attracted a large social media following, particularly on YouTube. As of 2021, Dry Bar Comedy videos have attracted over 2 billion views.

Tuttle Twins
Loosely based on books of the same title by Connor Boyack and Elijah Stanfield, Tuttle Twins follows twins Ethan and Emily Tuttle who go on adventures with their grandma on her time-traveling wheelchair. It held the all time crowdfunding record for a kids show until it was surpassed by The Wingfeather Saga.

The Wingfeather Saga
Angel Studios produced an animated TV adaptation of The Wingfeather Saga, a fantasy book series for children and young adults written by Andrew Peterson. Investors poured in $5 million to produce the first season, which is currently streaming.

Feature films
A forthcoming film titled The Shift, a sci-fi film starring Neal McDonough, Sean Astin, Kristoffer Polaha, and Emily Rose, will be Angel Studios's first original theatrical feature film. Other forthcoming feature films include David, an animated film about the eponymous biblical hero, and His Only Son, a live-action drama retelling the biblical story of Abraham and Isaac.

References

External links
 

American film studios
American companies established in 2014
Film production companies of the United States
Companies based in Utah
Entertainment companies established in 2014
Film distributors of the United States